The common redpoll or mealy redpoll (Acanthis flammea) is a species of bird in the finch family. It breeds somewhat further south than the Arctic redpoll, also in habitats with thickets or shrubs.

Taxonomy
The common redpoll was listed in 1758 by Linnaeus in the 10th edition of his Systema Naturae under the binomial name Fringilla flammea. The current genus name Acanthis is from the Ancient Greek akanthis, a name for a small now-unidentifiable bird, and flammea is the Latin for "flame-coloured".

The common redpoll was previously placed in the genus Carduelis. Molecular phylogenetic studies showed that the Arctic and common redpolls formed a distinct lineage, so the two species were grouped together in the resurrected genus Acanthis.

Subspecies
The nominate subspecies A. f. flammea, the mealy redpoll, breeds across the northern parts of North America and the Palearctic. There is also a subspecies that breeds in Iceland called the Icelandic redpoll (A. f. islandica), and one that breeds in Greenland and Baffin Island called the Greenland redpoll (A. f. rostrata). Many taxonomic authorities consider the lesser redpoll a subspecies of the common redpoll. Together, the Icelandic and Greenland forms are sometimes known as the 'northwestern redpolls'. All the subspecies migrate south into Canada, the northern U.S., or Eurasia. These birds are remarkably resistant to cold temperatures and winter movements are mainly driven by the availability of food. There are two distinct populations (one lighter, one darker) united in islandica, the relationships of which are unresolved.

Description

The common redpoll is a small brownish-grey finch with dark streaks and a bright red patch on its forehead. It has a black bib and two pale stripes on the wings. Males often have their breasts suffused with red. Wingspan ranges from 7.5 to 8.7 in (19-22 cm). The rump is streaked and there is a broad dark brown streak across the vent. It has brown legs, dark-tipped yellowish bills and dark brown irises.

Similar species
The mealy redpoll is larger and paler than the lesser redpoll with which it often mixes, apparently without significant interbreeding, though sympatry was established too recently to draw firm conclusions. The male mealy redpolls are darker than the similarly sized Arctic redpolls, but the females are almost identical.

Behaviour
The range of the common redpoll extends through northern Europe and Asia to northern North America, Greenland and Iceland. It is a partial migrant, moving southward in late autumn and northward again in March and April. Its typical habitat is boreal forests of pines, spruces and larches. It feeds mainly on seeds, principally birch and alder seeds in the winter.

The common redpoll builds its nest low down in a tree or bush. The nest has an outer layer of thin twigs, a middle layer of root fibres, fragments of juniper bark and lichens and an inner layer of down, willow buds and reindeer hair. Three to seven speckled eggs are laid and incubated by the female. They hatch after about 11 days and the young fledge in about a further 13 days.

References

External links

Audio recordings from Xeno-canto
Oiseaux.net Photos
 Common Redpoll Species Account – Cornell Lab of Ornithology
 
 
 Feathers of Common Redpoll (Carduelis flammea)
 

common redpoll
Holarctic birds
common redpoll
common redpoll
Articles containing video clips